Lambert Packard (1832-1906) was an American architect from St. Johnsbury, Vermont.

Life and career
He was born in 1832 Coventry, Vermont, to Jefferson Packard. The family moved to Waterford in 1847, where Packard learned the carpenter's trade. At age 15 he left home, working for engineers and architects in Lowell and Lawrence, Massachusetts. By the 1860s, he was in Boston working as a pattern maker. In 1866 he moved back to Vermont, having been employed as a foreman with E. & T. Fairbanks & Co. in St. Johnsbury. Before long, he also became company architect, and was in charge of all construction at the Fairbanks works. He developed a friendship with Franklin Fairbanks, who had been a partner in the firm since 1856, and served as its president from 1881 to 1895. Through the beneficence of the Fairbanks family, Packard designed most of the town's major buildings.

He worked alone until 1896, when he established a partnership with J. Albert Thorne of Montpelier. They parted ways soon after, but Packard established a new partnership, Packard & Tyrie, circa 1899. His last known commission came in 1904, and he died in 1906.

In 1862, Packard married Amanda F. Richardson of Lawrence, Massachusetts. They had three children, two sons and a daughter.

Legacy
A number of his works are listed on the U.S. National Register of Historic Places.

Architectural works

Lambert Packard, before 1896
 1870 - Bank Block, 1194 Main St, St. Johnsbury, Vermont
 1870 - South (Fuller) Hall, St. Johnsbury Academy, St. Johnsbury, Vermont
 Demolished.
 1871 - Franklin Fairbanks House (Underclyffe), Underclyffe Rd, St. Johnsbury, Vermont
 Demolished.
 1872 - North (Colby) Hall, St. Johnsbury Academy, St. Johnsbury, Vermont
 Demolished.
 1872 - Universalist Church of the Messiah, 47 Cherry St, St. Jonsbury, Vermont
 Largely demolished in 1972.
 1873 - Edward T. Fairbanks House (Sheepcote), 67 Fairbanks Dr, St, Johnsbury, Vermont
 Presently a dormitory of St. Johnsbury Academy.
 1873 - I. O. O. F. Block, 336 Railroad St, St. Johnsbury, Vermont
 1877 - North Congregational Church, 1325 Main St, St. Johnsbury, Vermont
 1883 - Y. M. C. A. Building, Eastern Ave near Main, St. Johnsbury, Vermont
 Burned.
 1884 - William P. Fairbanks House (Brantview), 1000 Main St, St. Johnsbury, Vermont
 1885 - Masonic Block, 1262 Main St, St. Johnsbury, Vermont
 Burned in 2009.
 1885 - Orleans County Courthouse, 274 Main St, Newport, Vermont
 1885 - Passumpsic Savings Bank Building, 1236 Main St, St. Johnsbury, Vermont
 1886 - Pinkerton Academy, 5 Pinkerton St, Derry, New Hampshire
 1888 - Hanover Inn, 2 E Wheelock St, Hanover, New Hampshire
 Remodeled in 1902, and demolished in 1966.
 1888 - Lane & Davis Block, Main St, Newport, Vermont
 Demolished.
 1888 - Charles H. Stevens House, 1525 Main St, St. Johnsbury, Vermont
 1889 - Fairbanks Museum, 1302 Main St, St. Johnsbury, Vermont
 1890 - Bartlett Hall, Dartmouth College, Hanover, New Hampshire
 1890 - Hotel Low, 114 S Main St, Bradford, Vermont
 Demolished in 1960.
 1890 - Pythian Block, 196 Eastern Ave, St. Johnsbury, Vermont
 Home to Packard's office.
 1890 - Spaulding High School (former), 60 Washington St, Barre, Vermont
 1892 - Fairbanks Block, 1197 Main St, St. Johnsbury, Vermont
 1892 - Lane's Block, 8 Field Ave, Newport, Vermont
 Burned in 1923.
 1893 - Merchants National Bank Building, 370 Railroad St, St. Johnsbury, Vermont
 1894 - Citizens Savings Bank Building, 364 Railroad St, St. Johnsbury, Vermont
 1894 - Hotel Lyndon, 76 Depot St, Lyndonville, Vermont
 Burned in 1924, replaced by the Darling Inn.
 1894 - Woods Library Building, 21 S Main St, Bradford, Vermont
 1895 - Jeudevine Memorial Library, 93 N Main St, Hardwick, Vermont
 1895 - Lyndonville Savings Bank Building, 1033 Broad St, Lyndonville, Vermont
 Demolished in 1962.
 1895 - Passumpsic Baptist Church, 4544 U. S. 5, Passumpsic, Vermont
 1895 - St. Johnsbury Hospital (former), 90 Prospect St, St. Johnsbury, Vermont
 1896 - Julia Pettigrew Hutchins House (Remodeling), 261 Park Ave, Lyndonville, Vermont
 1896 - New Avenue Hotel, 10 Eastern Ave, St. Johnsbury, Vermont

Packard & Thorne, 1896-1898
 1897 - St. John R. C. Church, 49 Winter St, St. Johnsbury, Vermont
 1898 - Superintendent's House, St. Johnsbury Federal Fish Culture Station, 374 Emerson Falls Rd, St. Johnsbury, Vermont

Lambert Packard, 1898-c.1899
 1898 - Currier Block, 185 N Main St, Barre, Vermont
 Burned in 1903.

Packard & Tyrie, c.1899
 1899 - Portland Street School, 510 Portland St, St. Johnsbury, Vermont

Lambert Packard, before 1906
 1903 - Barn, West View Farm, Waterford Hwy. 34, Waterford, Vermont
 1904 - A. C. Blanchard Block, 14 N Main St, Barre, Vermont

References

19th-century American architects
Architects from Vermont
People from Orleans County, Vermont
1832 births
1906 deaths